Streptomyces amphotericinicus is a bacterium species from the genus of Streptomyces which has been isolated from the head of the ant Camponotus japonicus. Streptomyces amphotericinicus produces amphotericin.

See also 
 List of Streptomyces species

References

External links
Type strain of Streptomyces amphotericinicus at BacDive -  the Bacterial Diversity Metadatabase

amphotericinicus
Bacteria described in 2017